William Kelley is the name of:

 William Kelley (baseball) (1875–?), American baseball player
 William K. Kelley, Deputy White House Counsel for the George W. Bush Administration
 William Donald Kelley (1925–2005), orthodontist and inventor of alternative cancer treatments
 William D. Kelley (1814–1890), U.S. Representative from Pennsylvania
 William Melvin Kelley (1937–2017), novelist and professor at Sarah Lawrence College, 2008 winner of the Anisfield-Wolf Book Award for lifetime achievement
 Bill Kelley (American football) (1926–2015), American football tight end who played for the Green Bay Packers in 1949
 William Kelley (screenwriter), Academy Award-winning screenwriter of Witness
 William B. Kelley (1942–2016), Chicago gay activist and lawyer

See also
 William Kelly (disambiguation)